Alexandre Teklak (born 16 August 1975 in Charleroi) is a Belgian football player who currently plays for RJS Heppignies-Lambusart-Fleurus.

References
Guardian Football

Belgian footballers
1975 births
Living people
Sportspeople from Charleroi
Footballers from Hainaut (province)
Association football defenders
R.E. Mouscron players
R.A.A. Louviéroise players